Holešovice is a district in the north of Prague situated on a meander of the River Vltava, which makes up the main part of the district Prague 7 (an insignificant part belongs to Prague 1). In the past it was a heavily industrial suburb; today it is home to the main site of the Prague's National Gallery in Veletržní palác, the DOX Center for contemporary art, and National Technical Museum.  On the Strossmayer Square lies neo-Gothic Church of St. Anthony of Padua.

Holešovice were named as one of the 10 Europe coolest neighborhoods by The Guardian in 2020.

Transport 
There are two metro stops in Holešovice, both on the C line – Vltavská and Nádraží Holešovice, which is connected with one of the largest railway stations in Prague of the same name. This district is also crossed with many tram and bus stops. This district is considered one of the most bike-friendly districts in the whole city, having many bike lanes a bikeways.

References

External links 

 Audio tour with information about the Prague Market on the compound of the town's former slaughterhouse, Prague's first multi-story garage and the former harbor.

Districts of Prague
Prague 7